Events from the year 1750 in Great Britain.

Incumbents
 Monarch – George II
 Prime Minister – Henry Pelham (Whig)
 Parliament – 10th

Events

 17 January – John Canton reads a paper in the presence of the Royal Society of London on a method of making artificial magnets.
 8 February – an earthquake is felt in London.
 8 March – a second more powerful earthquake is felt in London.
 20 March – Samuel Johnson begins publication of the periodical The Rambler.
 11 April – Jack Slack (a butcher of Norwich) defeats Jack Broughton to become bare-knuckle boxing Champion of England 
 24 June – Iron Act, passed by Parliament, comes into effect, restricting manufacture of iron products in the American colonies.
 5 October – Treaty of Madrid, a commercial treaty with Spain, is signed.
 18 November – Westminster Bridge is officially opened for the general public to use, the only fixed crossing of the River Thames between London Bridge and Putney.

Undated
 Establishment of the Jockey Club and the Pytchley Hunt.
 Thomas Gainsborough's painting Mr and Mrs Andrews.

Births
 24 January – Helen Gloag, Scottish-born slave Empress of Morocco (died 1790)
 18 February – David Bogue, nonconformist leader (died 1825)
 April – Joanna Southcott, religious fanatic (died 1814)
 2 May – John André, British Army officer of the American Revolutionary War (died 1780)
 6 June – William Morgan, actuary (died 1833)
 13 June – James Burney, admiral (died 1821)
 26 September – Cuthbert Collingwood, 1st Baron Collingwood, admiral (died 1810)

Deaths
 7 February – Algernon Seymour, 7th Duke of Somerset, aristocrat (born 1684)
 8 February – Aaron Hill, dramatist (born 1685)
 29 March – James Jurin, physician and mathematician (born 1684)
 7 April – George Byng, 3rd Viscount Torrington, general (born 1701)
 28 July – Conyers Middleton, religious controversialist and classical scholar (born 1683)
 8 August – Charles Lennox, 2nd Duke of Richmond, aristocrat, philanthropist and cricket patron (born 1701)
 3 October – 'Captain' James MacLaine (or Maclean), gentleman highwayman (born 1724) (hanged at Tyburn)
 13 December – Philemon Ewer, shipbuilder (born 1702)

References

 
Years in Great Britain